TV47 is a television channel based in Kenya. It is owned by Cape Media Limited, an affiliate of Mount Kenya University. It was launched in 2019 and its main broadcast languages are English and Kiswahili. TV47 is a late entrant in the mass media in Kenya. There are more than 50 television stations in Kenya. These stations include Citizen TV, by Royal Media Services of Samuel Kamau Macharia, Kenya Television Network by The Standard (Kenya), NTV (Kenyan TV channel) by Nation Media Group, and K24 TV by Media Max Limited.

The station started as Lemigo TV in Kigali, Rwanda in 2014. Lemigo changed its name to Royal TV, and later to TV47 when it left the Rwandan market for Kenya. TV47 is licensed by the Communication Authority of Kenya. An October to December 2020 survey by Geopoll, a media audience research firm shows that its audience is in the 15–34 years age group. It also available, on several platforms. 
In November 2021, the TV station received a complaint from the Media Council of Kenya for violating the Journalists Code of Conduct.

News and Programmes 

TV47 broadcasts news and entertainment programmes. These include soap operas, political talk shows, and live events.

News

 TV47 Newsnight
 Upeo Wa TV47
 Matokeo Mtambuko
 NewsFeed

Programmes

 Churchill Show 
 Churchill Experience 
 Bomba La Sanaa
 Pundits' Night
 Kilimo Diaries
 Tech47
 Night-Ins With Joy
 Morning Cafe
 The Grind
 All Access
 Men's Conference
 Banterzone
 Sifa Sunday
 The Realtor
 Tasnia Ya Elimu
 Kid On The Block
 Irie Vybz
 Africa Express
 Beyond The Limit
 Destiny
 So Much Love
 Beat Plug

Presenters 
TV 47 has the most youthful presenters.
 Frederick Muitiriri 
 Abubakar Abdullahi 
 Elizabeth Mutuku 
 Sharon Baranga 
 Linda Alela 
 Joash Onsare
 Muthoni Maina
 Paul Kirobi
 Andrine Kilemi 
 Errol Silverman
 Dennis Otieno
 Tony Mwirigi
 Bancey Kimuyu
 Heminigilder Mugeni
 Eric Munene

Location 
TV47 is located in Nairobi, Parklands.

References

Television_stations_in_Kenya
Television_channels_and_stations_established_in_2019